The Gustav Stolper Prize is an award given by the Verein für Socialpolitik to outstanding scientists who have used economic research to influence the public debate on economic issues, and have contributed substantially to the understanding and solution of current economic problems. It is named for the Austrian-German economist and politician Gustav Stolper.

Recipients
Source:  Verein für Socialpolitik

See also 

 List of economics awards
 Erwin Plein Nemmers Prize in Economics
 Nobel Memorial Prize in Economic Sciences

References

External links

  Verein für Socialpolitik Gustav-Stolper-Preis page (in German)
  Verein für Socialpolitik Gustav Stolper Prize page (in English)

Economics awards
German awards